Jacqueline Murekatete is a lawyer, human rights activist and the founder of the nonprofit organization Genocide Survivors Foundation.  Aged nine, Murekatete lost her entire immediate family and most of her extended family in the 1994 Rwandan genocide against the Tutsi. She was granted asylum in 1995 in the US, where she was brought up by her uncle. Murekatete began to tell her story of survival and hope after David Gewirtzman, a survivor of The Holocaust, spoke of his experiences at her school and inspired her to take action.

Murekatete's nonprofit, Genocide Survivors Foundation educates people about Genocide and other mass atrocity crimes, and raises funds to support genocide survivors.

Murekatete has received many prestigious awards including the Global Peace and Tolerance Award from Friends of the United Nations, the Kay Family award from the Anti-Defamation League, the Moral Courage award from the American Jewish Committee, the Do Something Award from Do Something, the Young Rwandan Achievers award from Imbuto Foundation and the Ellis Island Medal of Honor Award from the National Ethnic Coalition which put her name in the USA congressional record.

References

Bibliography

https://www.bkreader.com/2019/04/22/25-years-after-the-rwandan-genocide-a-survivor-speaks-out-against-hate/
https://genocidesurvivorsfoundation.org/
https://jewishweek.timesofisrael.com/united-by-horror/

https://www.pbs.org/newshour/show/remembering-the-past
https://facingtoday.facinghistory.org/interview-with-rwandan-genocide-survivor-jacqueline-murekatete
https://www.nyu.edu/alumni/changemakers/bios/bio-jacqueline-murekatete.php

Rwandan human rights activists
Year of birth missing (living people)
Living people
Rwandan women
New York University alumni